The Andorra national football team represents Andorra in association football and is controlled by the Andorran Football Federation, the governing body of the sport there. It competes as a member of the Union of European Football Associations (UEFA), which encompasses the countries of Europe. Andorra joined UEFA and the International Federation of Association Football (FIFA) in 1996.

Andorra's first match—a 6–1 defeat against Estonia—took place on 13 November 1996. Their first victory came in their twenty fourth match, 2–0 against Belarus. They entered their first major international competition in 1998, the qualifying rounds for the 2000 UEFA European Football Championship. The team won their first non-friendly match on 13 October 2004 when they defeated Macedonia 1–0 in the 2006 FIFA World Cup qualification competition.

The team's largest victories came on 26 April 2000, 17 April 2002 and 22 February 2017 when they defeated Belarus, Albania and San Marino respectively by two goals to nil in friendly matches. Their worst losses are 8–1 against Czech Republic in 2005 and 7–0 against Croatia in 2006. Ildefons Lima holds the appearance record for Andorra, having been capped 109 times since 1997. Lima also holds the goalscoring record with eleven goals. As of April 2019, Andorra are ranked 134th in the FIFA World Rankings. Its highest ever ranking of 125th was achieved in September 2005.

Results

1996

1997

1998

1999

2000

2001

2002

2003

2004

2005

2006

2007

2008

2009

2010

2011

2012

2013

2014

2015

2016

2017

2018

2019

References

 RSSSF archive of international results 1996–2002 (list of results)
 RSSSF archive of most capped players, highest goalscorers and coaches
 ITV Football-Statistics/Andorra
 Football.co.uk:Andorra
 National Football Teams
 UEFA
 FIFA

External links
Andorran Football Federation
Andorra national football team at EU-Football.info

Andorra national football team results
Andorra national football team